Jalan Jambatan Kota, Federal Route 2 and 5, is a major highway in Klang, Selangor, Malaysia. It connects Bulatan Simpang Lima roundabout interchange until Bulatan 100 roundabout interchange.

List of interchanges

See also
Federal Highway
Malaysia Federal Route 2
Malaysia Federal Route 5

Highways in Malaysia
Malaysian Federal Roads
Expressways and highways in the Klang Valley